"Only You" is the debut single from R&B group 112. It is the lead single from their self-titled debut album. Both the original and the remix were released as singles. Q, Slim, and Mike share lead vocals on both versions of the song. The original features The Notorious B.I.G., and the remix features both B.I.G. himself and Mase. The original contains a sample riff of "I Get Lifted" by KC and The Sunshine Band.

The song reached number one on two of Billboard's charts: Hot Dance Singles Sales and Hot R&B/Hip-Hop Airplay. The song made its debut at number thirteen on the Billboard Hot 100 on July 27, 1996, spending 39 weeks total on the chart.

The song was performed when the band guest-starred in two episodes of the UPN Sitcom Moesha.

Music video
The video was shot in the heart of Time Square. The video features 112, Notorious B.I.G., Puff Daddy & latest Bad Boy signee at the time Mase rapping in front of a crowd. Cameos are made by Lil' Cease, Stevie J and Keisha from Total.

Charts

Weekly charts

Year-end charts

Certifications

References 

1996 debut singles
1996 songs
112 (band) songs
The Notorious B.I.G. songs
Mase songs
Bad Boy Records singles
Songs written by Sean Combs
Songs written by the Notorious B.I.G.
Hip hop soul songs
Songs written by Slim (singer)
Songs written by Quinnes Parker
Songs written by Daron Jones
Songs written by Stevie J
Songs written by Mase
Songs written by Harry Wayne Casey
Songs written by Richard Finch (musician)